The Governor of Sevastopol is head of the executive branch of the political system in the city of Sevastopol. The governor's office administers all city services, public property, police and fire protection, most public agencies, and enforces all city and state laws within Sevastopol.

The governor's office is located on Lenin Street. It has jurisdiction over all districts of Sevastopol. The governor appoints many officials, including Directors who head city departments and deputy governors.

Prior to the annexation of Sevastopol by Russia in 2014, the city administrator was called the Chairman of Sevastopol City State Administration, and often referred to as the Mayor of Sevastopol. During this period in which Sevastopol functioned as a city with special status within Ukraine, the city administrator was appointed by the President of Ukraine. Since the Russian annexation in 2014, the status of the Crimea and of the city of Sevastopol is under dispute between Russia and Ukraine; Ukraine and the majority of the international community considers the Crimea and Sevastopol an integral part of Ukraine, while Russia, on the other hand, considers the Crimea and Sevastopol an integral part of Russia, with Sevastopol functioning as a federal city within the Southern Federal District.

List of governors since 2014

Heads of the city in previous eras

Russian Empire (–1917)

War/Military governors

Gradonachalnik (Chiefs of the City Municipality)

Revolution and Civil War (1917–1920) 
 March–July 1917: Sergey Nikonov (as city's commissar under the Provisional Government, S-R) 
 August 1917 – February 1918: Sergey Nikonov (as mayor)
 December 1917 – April 1918: Yuriy Gaven (as head of military revkom, Bolshevik)
 May–June 1918: Sergey Nikonov (as mayor)
 September 1919 – February 1920: Vladimir Subbotin (under the Whites)
 April–May 1920: Vladimir Sidorin (under the Whites)
 from November 1920: Aleksei Baranov (as Red Army commandant)

Soviet Russia (1920–1954)

First Secretaries of the City Committee of the Communist Party

Chairmen of the City Executive Committee

Burgermeister (under Nazi occupation)
 July–August 1942: Nikolay Madatov
 1942–1943: P. Supryagin

Soviet and Independent Ukrainian period (1954–2014)

See also
Sevastopol Police
Mayor of Moscow
Governor of Saint Petersburg

References

External links
Sevastopol City Council // Official Website, 
Sevastopol City's Executive committee
Sevastopol City Police // Official Website

Sevastopol
Sevastopol
Government of Sevastopol